Sriram Jha (born 18 July 1976) is an Indian chess Grandmaster. He competed in the FIDE World Cup 2009, for which he qualified by winning the Asian Zone 3.2 Chess Championship earlier in the same year. Sriram Jha played for the bronze medal-winning India's C team in the Asian Team Chess Championship in 2003. He also represented India in the World U26 Team Chess Cheampionship in 1997. In 2014 he won the Indian championship of rapid chess.

He is married to Indian chess International Master Subbaraman Vijayalakshmi.

References

1976 births
Living people
Chess grandmasters
Indian chess players
People from Madhubani, India